A normal school or normal college is an institution created to train teachers by educating them in the norms of pedagogy and curriculum. In the 19th century in the United States, instruction in normal schools was at the high school level, turning out primary school teachers. Many such schools are now called teacher training colleges or teachers' colleges, but in Mexico continue to be called normal schools, with student-teachers being known as normalistas. Many schools currently require a high school diploma for entry, and may be part of a comprehensive university. Normal schools in the United States, Canada and Argentina trained teachers for primary schools, while in Europe, the equivalent colleges typically educated teachers for primary schools and later extended their curricula to also cover secondary schools.

In 1685, St. Jean-Baptiste de La Salle, established the Institute of the Brothers of the Christian Schools, founded what is generally considered the first normal school, the École Normale, in Reims, Champagne, France. The term "normal" in this context refers to the goal of these institutions to instill and reinforce particular norms within students. "Norms" included historical behavioral norms of the time, as well as norms that reinforced targeted societal values, ideologies and dominant narratives in the form of curriculum.

The first public normal school in the United States was founded in Concord, Vermont by Samuel Read Hall in 1823 to train teachers. In 1839, the first state-supported normal school was established by the Commonwealth of Massachusetts on the northeast corner of the historic Lexington Battle Green; it evolved into Framingham State University. The first modern teacher training school in China was established by educator Sheng Xuanhuai in 1895 as the normal school of the Nanyang Public School (now Shanghai Jiao Tong University) in Shanghai during the Qing dynasty.

Many comprehensive public or state-supported universities, such as San Diego State University, UCLA and Arizona State in the United States and Beijing Normal University in China, were established and operated as normal schools before they expanded their faculties and transformed themselves into research universities. Some of these universities, particularly in Asia, retain the word "Normal" in their name to recognize their historical purpose. In Canada, most normal schools were eventually assimilated into a university as its faculty of education, offering a one or two-year Bachelor of Education degree. Such a degree requires at least three, but usually four, years of prior undergraduate study.

Etymology
The term "normal school" originated in the early 16th century from the French école normale. The French concept of an "école normale" was to provide a model school with model classrooms to teach model teaching practices to its student teachers. The children being taught, their teachers, and the teachers of the teachers were often together in the same building. Although a laboratory school, it was the official school for the children—primary or secondary.

Europe 
Educating teachers was of great importance in the newly industrialized European economies which needed a reliable, reproducible and uniform work force. The process of instilling such norms within students depended upon the creation of the first uniform, formalized national educational curriculum. Thus, normal schools, as the teacher training schools, were tasked with both developing this new curriculum and developing the techniques through which teachers would instill these ideas, behaviors and values in the minds of their students.

Germany 
In Germany, schools of education only exist in the state of Baden-Württemberg. These schools prepare teachers for Grundschule (primary school) and secondary schools like Hauptschule and Realschule (Mainschool and Realschool). Teachers for the Gymnasium are educated at universities.

Finland 
In Finland, normal schools are under national university administration, whereas most schools are administered by the local municipality. Teacher aspirants do most of their compulsory trainee period in normal schools and teach while being supervised by a senior teacher.

France 
In France, a two-tier system developed since the Revolution: primary school teachers were educated at départemental écoles normales, high school teachers and university professors at the écoles normales supérieures. The écoles normales supérieures in France now mainly train researchers.

Italy 
In Italy, Normal Schools now are called Liceo delle Scienze Umane. 
The Scuola Normale Superiore di Pisa now focus mainly on training researchers.

Lithuania 
In Lithuania, Lithuanian University of Educational Sciences (LEU), former Vilnius Pedagogical University (VPU) is the main teachers' training institution, established in 1935.

Serbia 
In Serbia, the first public normal school was founded in Sombor, Vojvodina, by Avram Mrazović in 1778 to train teachers.
In 2018, the Faculty of Education in Sombor celebrated 240 years since the founding of the first school for the education of Serbian teachers called Norma. It was a teacher training college at the beginning called Norma college before it was closed in 1811 and another school was opened in its place in 1812 in Szentendre under the Declaratory Rescript of the Illyrian Nation. The new institution was named Regium Pedagogium Nationis Illiricae or Royal Pedagogium Of The Illyrian-Serbian Nation (also referred to in Latin as Preparandium or Preparadija in Serbian) which eventually was relocated back to Sombor in 1816. The Normal school - Teachers College is generally considered the first normal school or École normale in Sombor. The term "normal" in this case refers to "the goal of the institution to instill and reinforce particular norms within students". Also, these "norms included historical behavioral norms of the time, as well as norms that reinforced targeted societal values, ideologies and dominant narratives in the form of curriculum". For the longest time, this was the only academy for teachers' training in Serbian. The first woman academician of the Serbian Academy of Sciences and Arts Isidora Sekulić, the poet Jovan Dučić, the composers Petar Konjović and Josif Marinković are just some of the alumni of Norma.

United Kingdom 
In the United Kingdom, teacher training colleges were once named as such, and were independent institutions. Following the recommendation of the 1963 Robbins Report into higher education, teacher training colleges were renamed "Colleges of Education". Later in the 20th century some became a "College of Higher Education" or an "Institute of Higher Education".. For information about academic divisions devoted to this field outside of the United States and Canada, see Postgraduate Training in Education (disambiguation).

A restructuring of higher education in the UK during the first two decades of the 21st century resulted in some establishments taking the status of "university". The University of Chester, founded by the Anglican church traces its roots back to 1839 as the earliest training college in the United Kingdom. Others were also established by religious institutions and most were single-sex until World War II. Since then, they have either become multi-discipline universities in their own right (e.g. Bishop Grosseteste University; University of Chester; Edge Hill University; St Mary's University, Twickenham; Newman University, Birmingham; Plymouth Marjon University; University of Winchester; University of Worcester; York St John University) or merged with another university to become its faculty of education (e.g. Moray House).

In Wales, there were at least three institutions which included the word "Normal" in their name: Normal School, Brecon, subsequently relocated to become Normal College Swansea (where the academic and mathematician John Viriamu Jones was educated); and Normal College, Bangor (founded 1858), which survived until 1996, when it became part of University of Wales Bangor. The latter was one of the last institutions in the UK to retain the word "Normal" in its name.

Asia

Mainland China 

In Mainland China, the "normal school" terminology is still preserved in the official English names of former normal schools established in the late 19th and early 20th century. The Chinese term normal university (abbreviated 师大; shīdà) refers to a modern comprehensive university established as a normal school in the early twentieth century. These "normal universities" are usually controlled by the national or provincial government.

In 1895, Qing banking tycoon and educator Sheng Xuanhuai gained approval from the Guangxu Emperor to establish the Nanyang Public School in Shanghai, China. This comprehensive institution included the first normal school on the Chinese mainland. Since 1949, many former normal schools in China have developed into comprehensive research universities. As of 2012, Beijing Normal University and East China Normal University, both members of the national government's Project 985 program, have been ranked the top two among the mainland Chinese universities that originated as normal schools.

Indonesia 
In Indonesia, there were specialised higher institutions to train teacher by educating them in the norms of pedagogy and curriculum. Indonesian government created crash program around 1950 as B-I/B-II/PGSLP course. In year 1954, the government opened the Teacher Education Higher Education Institutions (PTPG) in Batusangkar, Manado, Bandung, and Malang by Education and Culture Ministerial Decision No. 382/Kab Year 1954. Both courses were integrated to Teaching and Pedagogy Faculty at nearby university. Government Decision No. 51 Year 1958 integrate Pedagogy Faculty into Teaching and Pedagogy Faculty. In year 1962, Ministry of Basic Education established Teacher Education Institute (IPG) for middle school teacher. In year 1963, B-I and B-II courses and IPG were merged into Teaching and Pedagogy Faculty under Ministry of Higher Education. In year 1963-1964, Teaching and Pedagogy Faculties were established as separate higher education institutions which were known as Teaching and Education Institutes (IKIP). Presidential Decision No. 93 Year 1999 allowed IKIP to develop non-educational sciences and marked the end of specialised teacher education higher institutions in general.

Malaysia 

In Malaysia, the Ministry of Education runs a total of 27 Institutes of Teacher Education (ITEs), which were formerly known as Teacher Training Colleges. These ITEs function primarily to educated both undergraduate and postgraduate teacher trainees. The ministry bureau responsible for overseeing them is the Teacher Education Division. The ITEs also run in-service teacher training and continuous professional development among qualified teachers.

Philippines 
In Naga City, the Philippines, one can find the oldest normal school for girls in the Far East, the Universidad de Santa Isabel. It is a sectarian school run by the Daughters of Charity. The first secular normal school was founded in 1901 by the Thomasites, the Philippine Normal School. It was converted into a college in 1949 and was elevated to its present university status in 1992 as the Philippine Normal University. In 2009, it was named National Center of Excellence for Teacher Education by virtue of Republic Act 9647. In Iloilo City, the West Visayas State University was originally established as a normal school in 1902; in 1994, it was recognized by the Philippines government as a Center for Teaching Excellence.

Taiwan 

In Taiwan, three universities served as national normal universities historically. Located in Taipei, Changhua, and Kaohsiung, the schools prepared secondary school teachers; these schools' missions have expanded since to make them de facto liberal arts universities.

Ten Taiwanese normal schools (abbreviated 師院; shīyuàn, "normal colleges") were established under Japanese rule and at the end of World War 2, serving for primary school teacher's education. These were promoted as teachers' colleges and later granted university status in 2000s. Some of these were merged with comprehensive university, such as National Hualien University of Education, which were merged with National Dong Hwa University in 2007.

Oceania

New Zealand 
In New Zealand, the term normal school can refer to a primary or intermediate school used for teacher training, such as the Epsom Normal Primary School (in Auckland), Kelburn Normal School, Palmerston North Intermediate Normal School, Papakura Normal School, Central Normal School in Palmerston North or Tahuna Normal Intermediate School. They were associated with a teachers' training college, such as the Auckland College of Education and the Dunedin College of Education, which became colleges of education that trained secondary as well as primary and intermediate school teachers.

North and South America

Canada

Alberta
The Calgary Normal School in Calgary was initially located at 412 - 7 Street SW in Calgary in what is called the McDougall School founded shortly after Alberta became a province in 1905. Its history is part of the founding of the University of Calgary in 1966. Another Normal school was founded at Camrose (also called Rosehaven Normal school) in 1912. The Edmonton Normal School, Edmonton, Alberta, Canada was opened in 1920 in Edmonton, Alberta.

In 1945 all normal schools in Alberta were merged into the University of Alberta's faculty of education.

British Columbia
In 1901, the first Provincial Normal School in British Columbia was opened in Vancouver. Classes commenced on 9 January 1901. In January 1909, the Provincial Normal school moved into a new facility and its own building located at 11th and Cambie (now part of City Square Mall). In 1915 a second Provincial Normal School opened in Victoria. Trainee teachers from greater Vancouver and the lower Mainland attended the Normal School in Vancouver. Students from Vancouver Island and students outside the Lower Mainland, that is, from the Upper Fraser Valley and communities in the interior of the province – enrolled in the Normal School in Victoria. That school was originally located in Victoria High School and later in its own building which is now part of Camosun College. In 1956 the responsibility for provincial teacher training was transferred to The University of British Columbia.

Manitoba
Central Normal School was founded in 1882 in Winnipeg. In 1905-06 a new building was constructed at 442 William Avenue. It was one of six Normal Schools in Manitoba, along with Brandon Normal School (1129 Queens Street, Brandon), Dauphin, Manitou, Portage la Prairie, and St. Boniface. Central Normal School moved to a facility in southwest Winnipeg in 1947. In the autumn of 1958, it was renamed the Manitoba Teachers' College. It was moved to the University of Manitoba in 1965, becoming its Faculty of Education.

New Brunswick
The New Brunswick Teachers' College was a normal school in Fredericton, New Brunswick which granted teaching certificates. It was founded on February 10, 1848, as the Provincial Normal School with Joseph Marshall de Brett Maréchal, Baron d'Avray as the first principal. In 1947, the institution changed its name to the New Brunswick Teachers' College. It closed in 1973, and its staff were integrated into the faculties of education at the Université de Moncton and the University of New Brunswick.

Newfoundland and Labrador
The Wesleyan Normal Day School was founded in 1852 by the Wesleyans under the Newfoundland School Society. This institution continued until 1901. In 1910, a normal school was established in St. John's by the Church of England which continued for a number of years. In 1921 the first non-denominational normal school was initiated and was discontinued in 1932. It was reorganized in 1934 as a department of the Memorial University College. In 1949, the institution's name was changed to Memorial University of Newfoundland.

Nova Scotia
The Nova Scotia Teachers College in Truro began in 1855 as the Provincial Nova Scotia Normal School opened in Truro, Nova Scotia. The school was closed in 1997 and the program essentially consolidated with other provincial universities including Acadia University, Mount St. Vincent, St. Francis Xavier, and Sainte-Anne.

Ontario
Thanks largely in part to the effort of education reformer Egerton Ryerson, the Ontario Normal School system came into being beginning in Toronto in 1847.

The London Normal School was located at 165 Elmwood Avenue in London, Ontario and commenced classes on February 1, 1900. By 1958, the building was no longer adequate and was moved to a new location on Western Rd. In 1973, London Teachers' College (as it was then called) (Elborn) merged with Althouse College to form the Faculty of Education at the University of Western Ontario. The building is now a prominent area landmark.

The North Bay Normal School, a teacher training school, was established in 1909 in North Bay Ontario to meet the needs of teacher education in Ontario's North. The school was renamed North Bay Teachers' College in 1953, and became Nipissing University College's faculty of education in August 1973. After the university received a prestigious award in 2010, the Faculty of Education was renamed the Schulich School of Education. See Nipissing University.

A school of pedagogy was formed in association with Toronto Normal School, offering advanced level courses suitable for high-school teachers. In 1897, the school was moved to Hamilton and renamed Ontario Normal College. The college closed in 1906 and the training was taken over by the faculties of education at the University of Toronto and Queen's University in Kingston.

The Ottawa Normal School was built in 1874 and opened in 1875. It was located at 195 Elgin Street. It was renamed the Ottawa Teachers' College in 1953, and was subsequently merged into the Faculty of Education of the University of Ottawa in 1974.

The Peterborough Normal School in Peterborough was officially opened on September 15, 1908, and operated until the late 1960s.

The Stratford Normal School was founded at 270 Water Street in 1908 in Stratford, Ontario. Its emphasis was primarily for training teachers for rural conditions. Its name was changed to Stratford Teachers' College in 1953 and closed its doors in 1973 having trained close to 14,000 teachers. The site was maintained, and was home to the Stratford Perth Museum for a number of years, being renamed the Discovery Centre. The museum moved to another location, however, and the building is now leased by the Stratford Shakespeare Festival, and has been named once again the Normal School Building.

Prince Edward Island
The Prince Edward Island Normal School has its origin in 1856 on the grounds of Prince of Wales College in Charlottetown, P.E.I.

Quebec
The first three École normales were established in 1857, two for French speakers in Montréal and Laval, and a third one in Montréal for English speakers. Additional institutions were added over the following century, until the system was finally phased out between 1963 and 1974.

Saskatchewan
The Saskatchewan Normal School, also once known as the Regina Normal School, was founded as early as 1890 in Regina moving into its first permanent structure in January, 1914. In 1964 it was transferred to University of Saskatchewan Regina Campus and in 1974 becoming part of the University of Regina. Another normal school was founded in the early 1920s in Moose Jaw and was later transferred into the Regina campus in 1959.

The Saskatoon Normal School in Saskatoon was founded in 1912 and served until 1953. It has now been integrated with the Faculty of Education at University of Saskatchewan.

Jamaica
Mico University College is the oldest teacher training institute in the English-speaking world outside of Europe. It was founded under Lady Mico Charity in 1834 by Sir Thomas Fowell Buxton "to afford the benefit of education and training to the black and coloured population." Today, it offers undergraduate and graduate degrees in a variety of education and liberal arts disciplines.

Latin America

Argentina
In Argentina, normal schools were founded starting in 1852, and still exist today and carry that name. Teachers' training is considered higher education and requires a high school diploma, but normal schools have the particularity of granting five-year teacher degrees for primary school or four year degrees for kindergarten, while at the same time hosting secondary, primary school students, and kindergarten and pre-school. Teachers-to-be do intense practical training in the schools annexed to the higher education section. This is the main difference with other teachers' training institutions called Instituto de Formación Docente and with universities that grant teaching degrees.

Chile
Perhaps the oldest continually operating normal school in Latin America is the Escuela Normal Superior José Abelardo Núñez, founded in Santiago, Chile, in 1842 as the Escuela de Preceptores de Santiago under the direction of the emininent Argentine educator, writer, and politician Domingo Faustino Sarmiento. The first normal school in the Dominican Republic was founded in 1875 by Puerto Rican educator and activist Eugenio María de Hostos.

Mexico
Mexico founded early normal schools, such as the Escuela Normal de Enseñanza Mutua de Oaxaca (1824), the Escuela Normal Mixta de San Luis Potosí (1849), the Normal de Guadalajara (1881), and the Escuela Normal para Profesores de Instrucción Primaria (1887). The Mexican normal school system was nationalized and reorganized in the period after the Mexican Revolution (1910-1920) by the Secretaría de Educación Pública (Secretariat of Public Education) under José Vasconcelos in 1921. Many normal schools were founded in the postrevolutionary period to train the sons and daughters of peasants as teachers. In the 1960s, normal school students joined in the widespread student agitation to create systemic change in Mexico. The 2014 mass kidnapping of normal school students from Ayotzinapa Rural Teachers' College was a major scandal in Mexico.

Panama
In Panama, the Escuela Normal Juan Demóstenes Arosemena was founded in Santiago de Veraguas, Panama in 1938. In Colombia, normal schools were primarily associated with women's religious schools although in modern times have admitted men, thus forming escuelas normales mixtas (mixed normal schools). In Paraguay, they are known as Instituto de Formación Docente.

United States

In the United States, the former normal schools that survive in the 21st century have become colleges, usually requiring a high school diploma for entrance. Before the American Civil War public schools were elementary schools, and a normal school provided high school-level instruction as part of preparation for teaching the elementary grades. Many American universities began as normal schools.

New England
1823 - Columbian School in Concord, Vermont

In 1823, Reverend Samuel Read Hall founded the first normal school in the United States, the Columbian School in Concord, Vermont. Influenced by similar academies in Prussia and elsewhere in Europe, American normal schools were intended to improve the quality of the burgeoning common school system by producing more qualified teachers. Hall also founded the first normal schools in Massachusetts and New Hampshire. The school was renamed Concord Academy before closing after seven years.

1839 - Lexington Normal School, Lexington, Massachusetts

Sixteen years after Columbian School had been founded in Vermont, the first state-funded normal school was founded in the neighboring state of Massachusetts, thanks largely to the efforts of education reformers such as Horace Mann and James G. Carter. In 1844 that school moved from its original site of Lexington to West Newton, and then in 1853 to Framingham. Today, Framingham State University is recognized as the oldest continuously operated public normal school in the United States. Anna Brackett attended this university and was a teacher – later to become the first woman principal of a teachers' college.

1849 - State Normal School, New Britain, Connecticut

In 1849, the Connecticut General Assembly established a State Normal School, a training school for teachers. In 1850, a new building to house the Normal School was built in New Britain. In 1933, the school became the Teachers College of Connecticut and in 1959 it became Central Connecticut State College, and finally in 1983 renamed Central Connecticut State University. CCSU is the oldest publicly-funded higher education institution in Connecticut.

1854 - Rhode Island State Normal School, Bristol, Rhode Island

When the college was established in 1854 as the Rhode Island State Normal School, its goal was to provide teacher preparation to young people from Rhode Island. With the dedication of a new building in 1898, the institution began a period of steady growth, evolving first into a teachers' college, the Rhode Island College of Education. In the 1958–59 academic year the college moved to its current Mount Pleasant campus, and in 1959 was renamed Rhode Island College to reflect its new purpose as a comprehensive institution of higher education. With an enrollment predominantly from Rhode Island and nearby Massachusetts and Connecticut, the institution historically has served as a "College of Opportunity" for first-generation college students.

1854 - Salem Normal School, Salem, Massachusetts

Salem Normal School, now Salem State University, was founded in 1854 as the fourth Normal School in Massachusetts. In 1853, the General Court authorized the founding of a normal school in Essex County. Proposals were received from Salem, Chelsea, Groveland, and North Andover. Salem was selected due to many factors including the city's historical and commercial significance and need for local teacher education.

Prior to the founding of the normal school, Salem women had few opportunities to receive teacher training and the Salem school system was replete with funding, attendance, and teacher compensation problems. It was assumed that by training women as teachers, they could be hired at a lower salary than male teachers, thus alleviating the city's public school budget and teacher compensation challenges.

The original location was at the corner of Broad and Summer Streets, with the building's dedication held on September 14, 1854. Richard Edwards, a graduate of Bridgewater Normal School (now Bridgewater State University), was the first president of Salem Normal School.

1864 - Farmington State Normal School, Farmington, Maine
Established in 1864, Farmington State Normal School was the first public establishment of higher education in the state of Maine. In 1945, the school was renamed "Farmington State Teachers College". The Farmington State Teachers College was acquired by the University of Maine system in 1968 and is today the University of Maine at Farmington.

Northeast
1855 - Millersville Normal School, Millersville, Pennsylvania
Millersville Normal School was founded in 1855 as the first normal school in Pennsylvania. Over the years it has changed its name a number of times eventually becoming Millersville University of Pennsylvania.

1855 - The Paterson City Normal School, Paterson, New Jersey
A land grant institution founded as the Paterson City Normal School in the industrial city of Paterson, NJ to train teachers for NJ schools. In 1951, the school moved to the present campus in Wayne, NJ which was purchased by the State in 1948 from the family of Garret Hobart, twenty-fourth vice president of the United States and renamed Paterson State Teachers College. In 1971, it was renamed William Paterson College of New Jersey in honor of William Paterson (judge), a United States Supreme Court Justice appointed by President George Washington, after the legislative mandate to move from a teachers' college to a broad-based liberal arts institution. The New Jersey Commission on Higher Education granted William Paterson university status in June 1997 and it is now known as The William Paterson University of New Jersey (WPUNJ). The second oldest public university in the state; Rutgers (public) and Princeton (private) being older and pre-colonial.

1855 - New Jersey State Normal School, Trenton, New Jersey
Founded in 1855, the college was located in Trenton until 1928, when it moved to Ewing Township, where four year baccalaureate degrees began to be offered. The college exists today as The College of New Jersey.

1861 - Oswego Primary Teachers School, Oswego, New York

Established as Oswego Normal School, the Oswego State Normal School was founded by Edward Austin Sheldon, and recognized as a state school in 1866 by New York State becoming the Oswego State Normal and Training School. The school was part of the training program Sheldon devised to introduce the Pestalozzi method of education to the schools of the city of Oswego, the first time the method had ever been used in the United States. Sheldon's school became Oswego State Teachers College in 1942, and was upgraded again to a liberal arts college in 1962, becoming known as Oswego State University.

1865 - Baltimore Normal School for Colored Teachers, Baltimore, Maryland
Established in 1865 by The Baltimore Association for the Moral and Educational Improvement of the Colored People, School #1 opened on January 9, 1865, in the African Baptist Church in Crane's Building on the corner of Calvert and Saratoga streets. In 1867, with the aid of the Freedmen's Bureau, the Quakers of England and others, the Baltimore Association purchased and renovated the Old Friends Meeting House at the corner of Saratoga and Courtland streets to house the Baltimore Normal School for Colored Teachers. The school moved to Bowie, MD in 1911, changing its name to the Maryland Normal and Industrial School at Bowie in 1914. Today, this school exists as Bowie State University.

1866 - Maryland State Normal School, Baltimore, Maryland
While the state created the Maryland State Normal School in the state constitution of 1864, MSNS wouldn't open its doors in Baltimore until January 15, 1865. The school was moved to Towson, Maryland in 1915. In 1935, it was renamed the State Teachers College at Towson, and by 1963 it was changed to a liberal arts school and was renamed Towson State College. In 1976 it was renamed Towson State University and by 1997 it was Towson University.

1871 - Normal School, Buffalo, New York

Buffalo State was founded in 1871 as the Buffalo Normal School before becoming the State Normal and Training School (1888–1927), the State Teachers College at Buffalo (1928–1946), the New York State College for Teachers at Buffalo (1946–1950), SUNY, New York State College for Teachers (1950–1951), the State University College for Teachers at Buffalo (1951–1959), the State University College of Education at Buffalo (1960–1961), and finally the State University College at Buffalo in 1961.

Midwest
1853 - Michigan State Normal School, Ypsilanti, Michigan

The first normal school west of the Appalachian Mountains in the United States was the Michigan State Normal School, now Eastern Michigan University. It was created by legislative action in 1849 and opened in Ypsilanti, Michigan, in 1853.

1857 - Illinois State Normal University, Normal, Illinois

The State of Illinois passed an act to establish a normal school on 18 February 1857, and proposals were submitted to locate the new school in Batavia, Bloomington, Peoria, and Washington (in Tazewell County). Bids were opened by the State Board of Education in Peoria on 7 May 1857 and the offer from Bloomington, Illinois, was accepted. The normal school was located near the village of North Bloomington, which later was renamed Normal in honor of the school. The school, originally known as Illinois State Normal University (ISNU), and also known as the Illinois State Teachers College, is now known as Illinois State University.

1857 - Harris Teachers College, St. Louis, Missouri

Harris–Stowe State University, now a state university in Missouri, was founded by the St. Louis public school system in 1857 and claims to be the oldest normal school west of the Mississippi River.

The modern university is the result of the merger of the two normal schools in the area, Harris Teachers College, the older of the two institutions and segregated for white people only, and Stowe Teachers' College, which was segregated for black people only, following the Brown vs. BOE decision in 1954.

1858 - Winona State Normal School, Winona, Minnesota
The first state-authorized normal college to open west of the Mississippi River was Winona State Normal School, now called Winona State University, which opened in 1858. Its creation was one of the first acts of the newly formed Minnesota Legislature.

1863 - Kansas State Normal Schools, Kansas

In 1863, the Kansas Legislature passed an act to establish the Kansas State Normal Schools, starting with the first in Emporia, Kansas, which eventually became Emporia State University Teachers College. From 1870 through 1876, Leavenworth Normal School operated in Leavenworth, Kansas and from 1874 through 1876 Concordia Normal School operated in Concordia, Kansas, but the "miscellaneous appropriations bill of 1876" caused Leavenworth and Concordia to close and consolidated operations at the Emporia location. Other normal schools were opened in Kansas including in 1902 the Western Branch of the Kansas Normal in Hays, Kansas, eventually becoming Fort Hays State University. In 1904, a branch in Pittsburg, Kansas was opened as the Manual Training Auxiliary School, which eventually became Pittsburg State University.

1865 - Indiana State Normal School, Terre Haute, Indiana
Established by the Indiana General Assembly on December 20, 1865; as the State Normal School, its core mission was to educate elementary and high school teachers. The school awarded its first baccalaureate degrees in 1908 and the first master's degrees in 1928. In 1929, the Indiana State Normal School was renamed the Indiana State Teachers College, and in 1961, was renamed Indiana State College due to an expanding mission. In 1965, the Indiana General Assembly renamed the college as Indiana State University in recognition of continued growth.

1867 - Nebraska State Normal School, Peru, Nebraska

Nebraska State Normal School was chartered on June 20, 1867. The action by the Nebraska legislature made it the first state-supported college in Nebraska with the first classes held on October 24, 1867. The name changed to Nebraska State Teachers College at Peru in 1921, and in 1949 it changed to Peru State Teachers College. The current name of Peru State College was adopted in 1963.

1868 – Mankato Normal School, Mankato, Minnesota

Mankato Normal School was the second normal school in Minnesota. Students were usually 17–19 years old when they entered. The student body, which peaked at about 900 in 1920–21, was approximately three-fourths female. In 1921 the school evolved into Minnesota State University, Mankato.

1869 - Third State Normal School, St. Cloud, Minnesota

Located in St. Cloud, the Third State Normal School was the third normal school established in Minnesota. It welcomed 50 students (40 women and 10 men) as well as 70 children for the model school. Ira Moore was the school's first principal (later president). It graduated its first class, numbering 15, in June 1871. It trained mostly teachers through the end of World War II and then branched out into other disciplines. It is today's St. Cloud State University.

1876 - Iowa State Normal School, Cedar Falls, Iowa
Opened as Iowa State Normal School in 1876, the school took over the facilities that the state of Iowa originally built to be home to orphans of its Civil War Veterans. The school changed to Iowa State Teachers College in 1909, then State College of Iowa in 1961 before becoming the University of Northern Iowa in 1967.

1888 - Moorhead Normal School, Moorhead, Minnesota
Minnesota State Senator Solomon Comstock introduced a bill to the Minnesota State Legislature in 1885, declaring "…[a normal school] would be a fine thing for the Red River Country and especially for Moorhead."
Comstock then donated six acres of land and the next session of the Legislature appropriated $60,000 for the construction of Main Hall, which included classrooms, administrative offices and a library. When The Moorhead Normal School opened in the fall of 1888, President Livingston Lord presided over five faculty members and a class of 29 students. As the school expanded over the years, it went through several name changes, eventually becoming Minnesota State University Moorhead in 2000.

1899 - Ellendale State Normal and Industrial School

This was one of the schools of higher learning provided for in North Dakota’s 1889 constitution. Courses included American citizenship, cooking, woodworking, physical education, and others that together were offered as “a living symbol of democracy”.

Ohio
In 1871, the Northwestern Ohio Normal School, which later became Ohio Northern University, was founded in Ada, Ohio. The Lowry Normal School Bill of 1910 authorized two new normal schools in Ohio—one in the northwestern part of the state (now Bowling Green State University) and another in the northeastern part (now Kent State University).

South
1868 – Storer Normal School, Harpers Ferry, West Virginia

It served primarily African-American students; teachers were desperately needed after the Civil War, with large numbers of freed slaves to teach reading, writing, and arithmetic to. The school was part of Storer College, although in the 19th century it did not provide college-level instruction. The school closed in 1955.

1872 - Florence Normal School, Huntsville, Alabama
Florence Normal School is one of many state normal schools that developed into four-year state teachers' colleges and eventually into comprehensive state universities. This is the site of the first state-supported normal school established south of the Ohio River and now part of the University of North Alabama.

1873 - State Normal School, Normal, Alabama
In 1873, the State Normal School and University for the Education of the Colored Teachers and Students, informally called the Huntsville Normal School, was founded at a site which is today part of Huntsville, Alabama. In 1878, the name changed to State Normal and Industrial School. In 1885 the name was changed again, to State Normal and Industrial School of Huntsville. In 1890, the post office of Normal, Alabama was established. In 1896, its name was changed to The State Agricultural and Mechanical College for Negroes, and in 1919, the State Agricultural and Mechanical Institute for Negroes. In 1948 it was renamed the Alabama Agricultural and Mechanical College, in 1949 Alabama A&M College, and in 1969 Alabama A&M University.

1876 - Glasgow Normal School and Business College, Glasgow, Kentucky
In 1876, local businessman A. W. Mell opened a private normal school and business college in the small South Central Kentucky town of Glasgow. The institution changed its name to Southern Normal School and Business College when it moved to the larger city of Bowling Green. In 1906, after the Kentucky General Assembly (state legislature) authorized the creation of state-sponsored normal schools, the Southern Normal School was sold to the state, while the business school was sold privately, becoming Bowling Green Business University and later the Bowling Green College of Commerce. The normal school's facilities and student body became the new Western Kentucky State Normal School, which moved within Bowling Green in 1911 to the former site of Potter College, a women's college that had closed in 1909. Once the normal school was authorized by the state to offer four-year degrees in 1922, it was renamed Western Kentucky State Normal School and Teachers College. It changed its name twice more in the next 30 years, first to Western Kentucky State Teachers College in 1930 and Western Kentucky State College in 1948. WKSC merged with Bowling Green Commerce in 1963, with the latter becoming a constituent college of WKSC. The current institutional name of Western Kentucky University was adopted in 1966.

1877 - Summer Normal School of the University of North Carolina
In accordance with an act of the North Carolina General Assembly, the University of North Carolina at Chapel Hill opened a normal school in the summer of 1877. North Carolina was the first state in America to open a normal school under the control of an already-established university. The program was also the first university summer school in the United States. Coeducational from the beginning, it was the first example of public funds supporting education for women in North Carolina. One of the teachers, Emily M. Coe, was the first female teacher of classes at the university.

1879 - Sam Houston Normal Institute, Huntsville, Texas

The first normal school in what is now considered the Southwest was opened in 1879 as Sam Houston Normal Institute (now Sam Houston State University).

1882 - Virginia Normal and Collegiate Institute (now Virginia State University) was founded, Petersburg, Virginia.

1884 - Louisiana State Normal School, Natchitoches, Louisiana
From its founding in 1884 until 1944, Northwestern State University of Louisiana at Natchitoches was the Louisiana State Normal School until 1918, Louisiana State Normal College from 1918 to 1944.

1886 - Winthrop Training School, Rock Hill, South Carolina

In 1886, the Peabody Education Board of Massachusetts, headed by Robert C. Winthrop, provided $1,500 to form the "Winthrop Training School" for white women teachers. That year the school opened its doors to twenty-one students in Columbia, South Carolina. Nine years later in 1895 it moved to Rock Hill. The school's name had changed in 1893 to "Winthrop Normal and Industrial College of South Carolina", reflecting its mission to prepare some students for industrial jobs.

The college was segregated until 1964. It became fully coeducational in 1974. Evolving from a training school to a college with a four-year full curriculum, it also developed a graduate division. By 1992 it reflected this development, changing its name to Winthrop University.

1886 - State Normal School for Colored Persons, Frankfort, Kentucky

Chartered in 1886 as a state-supported school for training black teachers for the black schools of Kentucky, the school opened in 1887 with three teachers and 55 students. The school went through a series of changes of name and purpose, including becoming a land-grant college in 1890, in 1902 it was renamed Kentucky Normal and Industrial Institute for Colored Persons, in 1926 Kentucky State Industrial College for Colored Persons, in 1938 Kentucky State College for Negroes, in 1952 Kentucky State College, and finally in 1972 it became what it is known today as Kentucky State University.

1887 - Croatan Normal School, Pembroke, North Carolina
The school was established March 7, 1887 by the North Carolina General Assembly to train Lumbee Indian teachers. Today, it is The University of North Carolina at Pembroke.

1887 - Morehead Normal School, Morehead, Kentucky
In 1887, Morehead Normal School was founded as a private institution in Morehead, Kentucky. It continued to operate as such until 1922, when it was taken over by the state and became Morehead State Normal School. After name changes to Morehead State Normal School and Teachers College (1926), Morehead State Teachers College (1930), and Morehead State College (1948), it adopted its current name of Morehead State University in 1966.

1887 - State Normal College for Colored Students, Tallahassee, Florida
Also in 1887, the State Normal College for Colored Students was founded in Tallahassee, Florida; Tallahassee was chosen because it had the state's highest proportion of black people, having been the center of Florida's slave trade before the Civil War. The founding date reflects the Florida Constitution of 1885, in effect until 1967, which prohibed racial integration in education. In 1891 the legislature changed its name to State Normal and Industrial College for Colored Students, and in 1909 to Florida Agricultural and Mechanical College for Negroes. Today it is the Florida Agricultural and Mechanical University, commonly known as FAMU.

1899 - Appalachian State Normal School, Boone, North Carolina
A normal school founded as Watauga Academy in 1899, the institution was named Appalachian State Normal School in between 1925 and 1929. Today, it is known as Appalachian State University and has evolved into a comprehensive four-year university, including the Reich College of Education.

1906 - Eastern Kentucky State Normal School No. 1, Richmond, Kentucky
The same Kentucky law that authorized the state to take over the school now known as Western Kentucky University (see 1876 above) also led to the creation of a second normal school in Richmond. Much like the predecessor to WKU, the Richmond institution, originally known as Eastern Kentucky State Normal School No. 1, took over the campus of an earlier institution, though under somewhat different circumstances. The Eastern Normal School was established in 1906 on the former campus of Central University, an institution that had been founded in 1874 but fell into financial difficulty, and consolidated itself with Centre College in 1901. The Normal School went through several name changes in the following decades—first to Eastern Kentucky State Normal School and Teachers College (1922), Eastern Kentucky State Teachers College (1930), Eastern Kentucky State College (1948), and finally Eastern Kentucky University (1966).

1922 - Murray State Normal School, Murray, Kentucky
A Kentucky law enacted in 1922 authorized the creation of two new state-run normal schools in addition to those already operating in Bowling Green and Richmond (the institutions now known respectively as Western Kentucky University and Eastern Kentucky University). A normal school in Murray was created alongside one in Morehead (now Morehead State University). Unlike the three aforementioned schools, the Murray State Normal School was created from scratch, and had no buildings of its own when it began operation. The first classes were held in 1923 at the then-current campus of Murray High School, but the Normal School soon had its own facilities. The Normal School went through several name changes in the following decades—first to Murray State Normal School and Teachers College (1922), Murray State Teachers College (1930), Murray State College (1948), and finally Murray State University (1966).

West
1857 - California State Normal School, San Jose, California
The first state-run normal school on the West Coast was the Minns Evening Normal School, created in 1857 to train teachers for San Francisco's schools. It was taken over by the State of California in 1862 and became the California State Normal School (now San Jose State University).

1890 - Colorado State Normal School, Greeley, Colorado
The Colorado legislature passed the controversial Senate Bill 104 to establish the State Normal School of Colorado, which Governor Job Adams Cooper signed into law on April 1, 1889. Located in Greeley, Colorado, the school opened on October 6, 1890, to train qualified teachers for the state's public schools, with a staff of four instructors and 96 students, offering certification after completing a two-year course. In 1911, the school's name was changed to Colorado State Teachers College and offered bachelor's degrees after completion of a four-year course. In 1935, the name changed again to Colorado State College of Education, recognizing the graduate program started in 1913. In 1957, the name was shortened to Colorado State College to recognize the further growth of programs and offerings. Finally, in 1970, the name was changed to the current University of Northern Colorado, with satellite centers in Loveland, Colorado Springs and the Lowry neighborhood of Denver.

1910 - Western State College of Colorado, Gunnison, Colorado

State Senator A. M. Stevenson, Colorado, 1885 introduced a bill for a State Normal School. The bill was rejected. The bill revived in 1896. State Representative C. T. Rawalt succeeded in appropriating $2,500 for land in 1901. Gov. James B. Orman approved the bill April 16, 1901. Trustees were elected and plans made in Gunnison, Colorado in the northeast part of town. Grounds were surveyed and fenced, shade trees added, drives laid out, and the lawns seeded. 12 cents remained of the $2,500 dollars allotted. In 1903 a bill for $18,000 for maintenance was vetoed by Gov. J. H. Peabody. On May 5, 1909, $50,000 was appropriated. On October 25, 1910 the cornerstone of North Hall was laid for the State Normal School of Colorado. C. A. Hollingshead was principal of the two year normal advanced and four year normal elementary (High school). In 1916 the name was changed to Western State College of Colorado. On August 1, 2012, John Hickenlooper enacted the new name Western State Colorado University, and in 2018 the current name of Western Colorado University was adopted.

Other normal schools in the USA

 1861 - Edinboro State Normal School, later Edinboro University of Pennsylvania
 1862 - Mansfield State Normal School, later Mansfield University of Pennsylvania
 1862 - California State Normal School, later San José State University in San Jose and the University of California, Los Angeles in Los Angeles
 1867 - State Normal School of Marshall College, later Marshall University of West Virginia
 1869 - Southern Illinois State Normal School, later Southern Illinois University Carbondale
 1871 - Buffalo Normal School opened September 13 later State University of New York College at Buffalo also known as Buffalo State College  
 1882 - Normal School at Cheney, later Eastern Washington University
 1882 - Virginia Normal and Collegiate Institute, then Virginia Normal and Industrial Institute, later Virginia State University
 1886 - Washington State Normal School at Bellingham or Northwest Normal School or State Normal School at Whatcom, later Western Washington University
 1867 - Fredonia Normal College, established as Fredonia Academy in 1826, became a normal school Dec. 2, 1867. In 1948 it became State University of New York at Fredonia
 1887 - Northern Branch of the California State Normal School, later California State University, Chico
 1889 - State Normal School at Cheney, later Eastern Washington University
 1889 - State Normal School of Colorado, in Greeley, Colorado later University of Northern Colorado, and in 1911 in Gunnison, Colorado later Western Colorado University
 1889- Slippery Rock State Normal School, later Slippery Rock University of Pennsylvania
 1890 - State Normal School at Valley City, later Valley City State University of North Dakota
 1890 - Territorial Normal School, later University of Central Oklahoma
 1891 - Washington State Normal School in Ellensburg, later Central Washington University
 1891 - State Normal School (Athens, Georgia), later University of Georgia
 1895 - Duluth State Normal School, later University of Minnesota Duluth
 1895 - Northern Illinois State Normal School, later Northern Illinois University
 1895 - Eastern Illinois State Normal School, later Eastern Illinois University
 1898 - San Diego Normal School, later San Diego State University
 1899 - Western Illinois State Normal School, later Western Illinois University
 1899 - Southwest Texas State Normal School, later Texas State University
 1899 - San Francisco State Normal School, later San Francisco State University
 1903 - Western State Normal School, later Western Michigan University
 1910 - West Texas State Normal College, later West Texas A&M University
 1923 - Durham State Normal School, later North Carolina Central University
 1925 - Maryland State Normal School, later Salisbury University

See also

 Female seminary
 List of normal schools by country
 Normal, Alabama
 Normal, Illinois
 Normal Station, Memphis

References

Bibliography

External links

 

 
Education by subject
History of education
School types
Teacher training
Types of university or college

fr:École normale